Campeonato Mato-Grossense is the football league of the State of Mato Grosso, Brazil. It is organized by the Mato Grosso State Football Federation.

Format

First Division 2006

First stage:

The teams are divided in two groups of six teams.
Double round-robin, in which all teams from one group play home-and-away games against all teams within the group.
Home-and-away playoff with the top teams of each group. The winner is crowned the champion of the first stage.
The teams last placed in each group are relegated to the second division.

Second stage:

The teams are divided in two groups of five teams.
Double round-robin, in which all teams from one group play home-and-away games against all teams of the other group.
Home-and-away playoff with the top teams of each group. The winner is crowned the champion of the second stage.

Third stage (if necessary):

Home-and-away playoff with the winners of the first and second stages.

If a team wins both stages (first and second) it is crowned the champion. If not, the third stage is disputed, and the winner is the champion.

As in any other Brazilian soccer championship, the format can change every year.

Clubs

First Division 2021
Sociedade Ação Futebol
Clube Esportivo Operário Várzea-Grandense (CEOV)
Cuiabá Esporte Clube
Clube Esportivo Dom Bosco
Associação Grêmio Sorriso
Luverdense Esporte Clube
Nova Mutum Esporte Clube
Poconé Esporte Clube
Sinop Futebol Clube
União Esporte Clube

List of champions

Following is the list with the champions of Campeonato Mato-Grossense:

Notes

Operário and Comercial from Campo Grande, Ubiratan from Dourados, and Corumbaense from Corumbá, disputed the Campeonato Matogrossense before the split of Mato Grosso do Sul, occurred in 1979.

Due to financial problems, Operário Várzea-Grandense (also known as CEOV) withdrew from professional football in 1996. As it is one of the clubs with the most fans in the state, EC Operário was created with the same colors (red and green) as the traditional CEOV. Despite being state champion twice (1997 and 2002), the club did not receive the expected support and closed its activities in 2002. Another club with a similar name was created (Operário Futebol Ltda.), this time with red and black colors in honor of CR Flamengo, and has won the 2006 tournament. Operário Ltda. currently competes in the second division and the original CEOV returned to professional football in 2013.

Titles by team

Teams in bold stills active. Teams in italic currently disputes the Campeonato Sul-Mato-Grossense.

By city

Copa Governador de Mato Grosso
The Copa Governador de Mato Grosso is a competition contested in the second semester of the year, by Mato Grosso state teams, originally to determine a spot in the following year's Campeonato Brasileiro Série C, but now to determine who will make it to the Série D.

References

External links
FMF Official Website
RSSSF
Copa Governador do Mato Grosso at RSSSF

 
Matogrossense
Football in Mato Grosso